The Faculty of Organisation Studies in Novo Mesto (FOS) is an independent (private) faculty, in Novo Mesto, Slovenia.  The Faculty of Organisation Studies in Novo Mesto holds ISO standards ISO 9001 and ISO/IEC 27001. The current dean is Boris Bukovec.

History
The Faculty of Organisation Studies in Novo Mesto was established in 2008 as a public-private partnership project between the private institute IOM and the former . When the latter was abolished in 2014, founding rights were transferred to the City Municipality of Novo Mesto.

In 2015, the institution was recognised by the Information Commissioner of the Republic of Slovenia for its efforts in the field of data protection.

Study programmes 
The Faculty of Organisation Studies in Novo Mesto offers study programmes at bachelor's, master's and doctoral levels in the field of quality management. Study programmes are accredited by the Slovenian national higher school accreditation agency (NAKVIS).

The bachelor's study programme lasts for 6 semesters and provides 180 ECTS credits. It is expert-oriented with the combination of compulsory courses in the field of economics, management and business administration, elective courses in relevant supportive fields and compulsory practical work in the business environment.

The master's study programme lasts for 4 semesters and provides 120 ECTS credits. It is oriented towards deepening the theoretical background of the conceptualisation of excellence and applying it in different fields (based on the selection of elective courses).

The doctoral study programme lasts for 6 semesters and provides 180 ECTS credits. It is research-based, with a compulsory subject of advanced methodology and an elective course (which provides also the proper field of the title) in the field closest to the candidate's research interest.

International collaboration 

Among other forms of cooperation with foreign institutions of higher education, the Faculty of Organisation Studies in Novo Mesto participates in the Erasmus+ programme of students and staff exchange.

Research and publishing 

The Faculty of Organisation Studies in Novo Mesto is developing its research activities within the research institutes. Currently, there are two operational institutes: for business excellence and for innovative tourism. Research output is available at COBISS/SICRIS (in Slovenian).

Since 2012, the faculty has organised an annual conference called Governance in (Post) Transition, which encompasses various current topics in the field of social sciences.

Every year since 2015, the Faculty has been organizing a scientific conference New Paradigms of Organizational Theories.

Since 2012, the Faculty has been publishing the scientific journal Journal of Universal Excellence and, since 2016, the journal Challenges to the Future. The journal is indexed in databases DOAJ, EBSCO, COBISS, dLib, Google scholar, MIAR, WorldCat (OCLC)

The faculty also publishes monographs by Slovenian and international authors.

The Faculty of Organisation Studies in Novo Mesto is also a member of the RENET network (Researchers' Excellence network)

References

External links 
Faculty of Organisation Studies in Novo Mesto

Universities in Slovenia
Business schools in Slovenia
2008 establishments in Slovenia
Educational institutions established in 2008